Think! is the second album by American organist Lonnie Smith recorded in 1968 and released on the Blue Note label.

Reception
The Allmusic review by Matt Collar awarded the album 4½ stars and stated "Think!, organist Lonnie Smith's 1968 sophomore effort for Blue Note, is easily one of the strongest dates the Hammond B-3 master would produce for the label".

Track listing
All compositions by Lonnie Smith except as noted
 "Son of Ice Bag" (Hugh Masekela) - 11:15
 "The Call of the Wild" - 12:31
 "Think" (Aretha Franklin, Ted White) - 4:46
 "Three Blind Mice" (Traditional) - 6:29
 "Slouchin'" - 6:52

Personnel
 Lonnie Smith - organ
 Lee Morgan - trumpet
 David Newman - tenor saxophone, flute
 Melvin Sparks - guitar
 Marion Booker Jr. - drums
 Norberto Apellaniz, Willie Bivens - conga (tracks 2 & 5)
 Henry "Pucho" Brown - timbales (tracks 2 & 5)

References

Blue Note Records albums
Lonnie Smith (organist) albums
1968 albums
Albums produced by Francis Wolff
Albums recorded at Van Gelder Studio